Detroit metro may refer to:

 Detroit Metropolitan Airport
 Detroit Metropolitan Area